Pristinamycin IA (Mikamycin B) is an antibiotic cyclic peptide.  It is a member of the streptogramin B group of antibiotics and one component of pristinamycin (the other being pristinamycin IIA).

Notes

Antibiotics
Peptides
Pyridines
Carboxamides